Edward M. Abroms (May 6, 1935 – February 13, 2018) was an Emmy Award-winning American film and TV editor.

Abroms was born and raised in Hollywood, Los Angeles. He studied film at the University of Southern California before dropping out to go to work at Republic Studios.

He was nominated at the 56th Academy Awards for his work on the film Blue Thunder in the category of Academy Award for Best Film Editing, his nomination was shared with Frank Morriss.

Abroms has worked with American film director Steven Spielberg on Night Gallery and The Sugarland Express and was bestowed the American Cinema Editors Career Achievement Award in 2006.

He received Primetime Emmy Awards for editing the My Sweet Charlie World Premiere in 1970 and the Columbo NBC Mystery Movie in 1972 He shared the 2006 American Cinema Editors Career Achievement Award. He also directed for the 1978-1979 NBC television series The Eddie Capra Mysteries.

On February 13, 2018, Abroms died of heart failure in Los Angeles, California. He was 82.

He has also worked as an editor in Sam Peckinpah’s suspense thriller film The Osterman Weekend (1983).

Career 
Abroms had joined Review Productions (present Universal Studios) as an apprentice editor after a short stint at Technicolor. He later got an opportunity to edit the 1966 episode of NBC's Tarzan, which had featured Ron Ely. He earned his first Emmy Award for the 1970 NBC telefilm My Sweet Charlie, directed by Lamont Johnson and starring Patty Duke.

Personal life 
Abroms married Colleen, with whom he has two daughters, Cindy and Lynn, and one son, Ed Abroms Jr.

Selected filmography
 1983: Blue Thunder
 1992: Grave Secrets: The Legacy of Hilltop Drive
 1994: Street Fighter

As an editor 

 The Osterman Weekend (1983)
 Night Gallery

References

External links
 

1935 births
2018 deaths
American Cinema Editors
University of Southern California alumni
American film editors
People from Hollywood, Los Angeles